Pyrmont was an electoral district of the Legislative Assembly in the Australian state of New South Wales that was created in the 1904 re-distribution of electorates following the 1903 New South Wales referendum, which required the number of members of the Legislative Assembly to be reduced from 125 to 90. It consisted of the abolished seat of Sydney-Pyrmont and part of the abolished seat of Sydney-Denison and included the Sydney suburb of Pyrmont. It was abolished in 1913 and the district re-distributed to Belmore, Darling Harbour and Phillip.

Members for Pyrmont

Election results

References

Former electoral districts of New South Wales
Constituencies established in 1904
1904 establishments in Australia
Constituencies disestablished in 1913
1913 disestablishments in Australia